Saticula is a genus of cicadas in the family Cicadidae. There are at least two described species in Saticula.

Species
These two species belong to the genus Saticula:
 Saticula coriaria Stal, 1866 c g
 Saticula vayssieresi Boulard, 1988 c g
Data sources: i = ITIS, c = Catalogue of Life, g = GBIF, b = Bugguide.net

References

Further reading

 
 
 
 

Cicadettini
Cicadidae genera